Red Sucker Lake (Oji-Cree: Mithkwamepin Thaakkahikan, ᒥᐢᑾᒣᐱᐣ ᓴᑲᐦᐃᑲᐣ) is an Oji-Cree First Nation in Manitoba, Canada, located about  northeast of Winnipeg. , the registered population was 1,067 of which 930 lived on their own reserve.

Its main reserve is Red Sucker Lake 1976, which contains the community of Red Sucker Lake, Manitoba.

Historically, the peoples of Red Sucker Lake were part of the Island Lake Band, which also included nearby First Nations of Garden Hill, St. Theresa Point, and Wasagamack. They are a signatory to the 1909 adhesion to Treaty 5.

History 
Red Sucker Lake First Nations once belonged to the Island Lake band, who, on 13 August 1909, became a signatory of Treaty 5. In 1969, Island Lake split into four separate communities with their own separate administrations: Garden Hill, Wasagamack, St. Theresa Point First Nations, and Red Sucker Lake. Today, the four communities have a Tribal Council, called Island Lake Tribal Council, to collaborate on common interests.

Reserves
The First Nation has eight reserves:

Governance
The First Nation elect their officials through the Custom Electoral System. Their council consists of a Chief and six councillors.

The First Nation maintains political affiliations with the Island Lake Tribal Council (ILTC), Manitoba Keewatinohk Okimahkanak (MKO), Assembly of Manitoba Chiefs (AMC), and Indian and Northern Affairs Canada (INAC).

Notable people

 Elijah Harper

See also

 Red Sucker Lake
Red Sucker Lake Airport
 Red Sucker Lake Water Aerodrome

References

External links
Official website
 Map of Red Sucker Lake 1976 at Statcan
 AANDC profile

Island Lake Tribal Council
First Nations governments in Manitoba
First Nations in Northern Region, Manitoba